Von der Decken's sifaka (Propithecus deckenii) is a sifaka lemur that is endemic to the arid, deciduous and spiny succulent forests of Western Madagascar. It has a length of 92 to 107 centimeters, of which 42-48 centimeters are tail. The species is named in honor of the German explorer Karl Klaus von der Decken.

Its pelage is usually creamy white, with tinges of yellow-gold, silver-grey or pale brown on the neck, shoulders, back and limbs. The face is entirely black. Group size is between two and ten individuals, with groups of three to six being the most common.

The IUCN lists its status as critically endangered, and it is listed in CITES Appendix I.

References

Sifakas
Mammals described in 1867
Taxa named by Wilhelm Peters